Macau made its Paralympic début at the 1988 Summer Paralympics in Seoul. Macau was represented by seven athletes competing in two sports, its largest delegation to date, and did not win a medal. Macau's Chong In Cheng competed in both athletics and swimming.

Competitors

Athletics
 women's 100m 2: Chong In Cheng
 men's 200m 5-6: Fung Sio Kam, Ip Chi Keong
 men's 1500m 2: Chu Cheng Lau
 men's 1500m 4: Kuok Se Hun
 men's pentathlon 3: Luis Filipe Rosa
 men's pentathlon 4: Fernando Carvalho
 men's marathon: Fung Sio Kam

Swimming
 women's 50m backstroke 2: Chong In Cheng
 women's 50m breaststroke 2: Chong In Cheng
 women's 50m freestyle 2: Chong In Cheng

See also
 Macau at the Paralympics

External links
International Paralympic Committee

References

Nations at the 1988 Summer Paralympics
1988
Paralympics